El canto del gallo is a 1955 Spanish drama film directed by Rafael Gil.

Synopsis 
In Hungary, during World War II and at a time when religious were being killed, Gans, a powerful communist commissar, saves the life of Father Miller, a former classmate. But in return he forces her to abjure his Catholic faith and go live with a prostitute. After that, Father Miller commits other sins such as denying confession to a dying man or ratting out a fellow priest. But repenting of his conduct, she returns to his old parish, where he will meet Gans again.

Cast
 Asunción Balaguer 
 S. Demoslavsky  
 Vicente Escrivá as child  
 Gracián Espinosa 
 César Gil as child
 Antonio García Gómez
 X. Heiss  
 José Luis Heredia 
 Francisco Herrera 
 Luis Induni 
 Julia Lajos
 Ivan Ljevakovich 
 Hortuño López 
 José Manuel Martín
 Jorge Ochando 
 Alicia Palacios 
 Mónica Pastrana 
 Jacqueline Pierreux
 Félix de Pomés
 Francisco Rabal
 G. Rahn  
 Antonio Riquelme 
 Carmen Rodríguez 
 Matilde Muñoz Sampedro 
 Emilio Sancho 
 Francisco Sánchez
 Porfiria Sanchíz 
 Gérard Tichy 
 José Villasante 
 Lutz Wallen 
 M. Wulff  
 José Wyrma

References

Bibliography 
 Bentley, Bernard. A Companion to Spanish Cinema. Boydell & Brewer 2008.

External links 
 

1955 drama films
Spanish drama films
1955 films
1950s Spanish-language films
Films directed by Rafael Gil
Films scored by Juan Quintero Muñoz
Spanish black-and-white films
1950s Spanish films